Radio Baseball is a 1986 video game published by Electronic Arts.

Gameplay
Radio Baseball is a game in which the screen displays the linescore (with current pitcher and batter), the complete lineup for each team, and the play-by-play.

Reception
Rick Teverbaugh reviewed the game for Computer Gaming World, and stated that "Overall, I enjoyed Radio Baseball and think it's a worthy entry into the baseball field. With a couple of changes, it could be all-star material."

References

External links
Article in Family Computing

1986 video games
Baseball video games
DOS games
DOS-only games
Electronic Arts games
Video games developed in the United States